Irby in the Marsh is a village and civil parish in the East Lindsey district of Lincolnshire, England.

Community
Irby has a population of 150 inhabitants in 72 households. Village houses are situated on the B1195 Spilsby Road, Pinfold Lane, and along local lanes and bridleways. Most residential properties are detached and date from late 18th-century farms and cottages to late 20th-century bungalows and individual houses. There has been barn conversions, and early 21st-century new-build properties on Pinfold Lane. At the southern edge of the village is the previous Prince Albert public house, now a private house.

Local recreation includes fishing, golf and cycling. The small market towns of Spilsby, and Wainfleet All Saints lie in either direction along the B1195.

Irby's  small Grade II* listed Anglican parish church is dedicated to All Saints, and seats approximately 95 people. Medieval in origin, it is constructed in greenstone and brick, and was re-detailed in 1770, with a new chancel added in 1886.

The Irby and Bratoft Village Hall is off Brambleberry Lane, close to the village boundary with Bratoft. The village hall is a community centre for social and group activities, and was refurbished in 2010. Planning permission was granted for the addition of a village shop and library at the hall in early 2012, with completion expected in 2013.

References

External links

"Irby in the Marsh", Genuki.org.uk. Retrieved 18 April 2012
All Saints Church, Irby in the Marsh; Forwardinfaithlincs.org.uk. Retrieved 18 April 2012

Villages in Lincolnshire
Civil parishes in Lincolnshire
East Lindsey District